"From the Land of the Sky-Blue Water" (1909) is a popular song composed by Charles Wakefield Cadman. He based it on an Omaha love song collected by Alice C. Fletcher. "Sky-blue water" or "clear blue water" is one possible translation of "Mnisota," the name for the Minnesota River in the Dakota language.

Composition 
Cadman's collaborator, Nelle Richmond Eberhart, wrote a poem as the lyrics:

The song became widely popular after noted American soprano Lillian Nordica performed it in concert in 1909.

Representation in other media
An arrangement of the song for harp and flute is performed by Harpo Marx in the 1940 Marx Bros. film, Go West.
Blanche DuBois in A Streetcar Named Desire by Tennessee Williams sings a part of the song in Scene Two while she is in the bathroom.  
The first line, "From the Land of Sky-blue Water", is sung by the Three Stooges in the film The Three Stooges In Orbit (1962), at about the three-quarter point in the film, before they launch into space for the first time.
The Hamm's Brewery used a version of the lyrics- "From the land of sky blue waters/ comes the beer refreshing" - as an advertising jingle through the mid-twentieth century, accompanied by pseudo-Native American drumming.

References

Bibliography
 Cadman, Charles Wakefield (m); Eberhart, Nelle Richmond (w). "Hamm's Brewery" (Sheet music). Boston : White-Smith Music Publishing Company (1909).

External links
 Sheet Music for Four American Indian Songs Op. 45 No. 1; words by Nelle Richmond Eberhart; White-Smith Music Publishing Co., 1909, includes music for "From the Land of the Sky-Blue Water"
 From the land of the sky-blue water – Florence Hinkle – Victor 60079 – Camden, New Jersey (1912-10-03) | National Jukebox LOC.gov
 From the land of the sky-blue water Musical score | Nebraska Memories

American popular music
American folk songs
1909 songs
Native American music
Songs used as jingles
Jeanette MacDonald songs